West Humber Collegiate Institute (WHCI, West Humber) is a public high school in Toronto, Ontario, Canada. It is situated at the corner of Martin Grove Road and John Garland Blvd., just south of Finch Avenue West in the neighbourhood of Rexdale. Opened in 1966, the institute is owned and operated by the Toronto District School Board. Prior to 1998, it was overseen by the Etobicoke Board of Education.

Since 1998, the school has annually awarded the Pamela M. Prinold Memorial Scholarship. This scholarship is given to a student who demonstrates community involvement, making a difference in their community, and strength in volunteering and leadership – all qualities that Pam Prinold was renowned for.

Feeder schools
Albion Heights Junior Middle School
West Humber Junior Middle School
Elmbank Junior Middle Academy
Greenholme Junior Middle School
Humberwood Downs Junior Middle Academy
Beaumonde Heights Junior Middle School

Notable alumni
David Visentin – realtor and television host
Hodan Nalayeh – media executive and entrepreneur
Wayne Gretzky – NHL hockey player

See also
List of high schools in Ontario

References

TDSB - West Humber Collegiate Institute

High schools in Toronto
Education in Etobicoke
Schools in the TDSB
Educational institutions established in 1966
1966 establishments in Ontario